South Yorkshire Police (SYP) is the territorial police force responsible for policing South Yorkshire in England.  
The force is led by Chief Constable Lauren Poultney. Oversight is conducted by Police and Crime Commissioner Alan Billings.

The force has received national attention for the unlawful killing of over 90 people in the Hillsborough Disaster, and the failure to investigate of child sex abuse in the Rotherham scandal in the 2000s.

History
The force was formed in 1974, as a merger of the previous Sheffield and Rotherham Constabulary along with part of the West Yorkshire Constabulary area (which Barnsley Borough Police and Doncaster Borough Police had been merged into on 1 October 1968).

During the miners strike of 1984 officers from South Yorkshire attacked striking miners then arrested 95 on the charge of rioting. It was found the Police Force had fabricated evidence, carried out false arrest and assaulted miners. No police officer has ever been disciplined or accepted responsibility for their actions. Ex officer Tony Munday has called for an inquiry into how South Yorkshire Police handled the aftermath of the Battle of Orgreave claiming he was told what to put in his statement "by a senior South Yorkshire detective" after he arrested a miner during the Orgreave confrontation. "I've never before or since, while I've been a police officer, been involved where effectively chunks of a statement were dictated. They weren't my words,"

The force was condemned by Prime Minister David Cameron in September 2012 for their dishonesty and gross negligence in their handling of the Hillsborough disaster in 1989, which led to an apology from the then Chief Constable David Crompton. The Hillsborough Independent Panel had exposed the way in which the force had attempted to divert blame from their own mishandling of the tragedy by feeding false information to the media and altering statements given by their own officers. In June 2013, UK newspaper The Guardian reported on emails sent by Crompton in which he had suggested that the families of fans killed at the Hillsborough disaster had been untruthful. In one, Crompton had written: "One thing is certain – the Hillsborough Campaign for Justice will be doing their version … in fact their version of certain events has become 'the truth' even though it isn't!! I just have the feeling that the media 'machine' favours the families and not us, so we need to be a bit more innovative in our response to have a fighting chance otherwise we will just be roadkill."

The force's judgement has been called into question over a number of incidents in the Rotherham child sexual exploitation scandal, where prosecutions were not undertaken.

In July 2014 South Yorkshire Police came under scrutiny once again following a much criticised filmed raid on the home of Sir Cliff Richard. No charges resulted but South Yorkshire police agreed to pay Sir Cliff £400,000 to settle a claim he brought against the force.

On 27 April 2016, it was reported that the force's Chief Constable David Crompton was to be suspended following statements made by South Yorkshire Police after the verdict of the jury in the second Hillsborough disaster inquest. He was temporarily replaced by Deputy Chief Constable Dawn Copley, but the following day it was announced that she herself would be stepping down "in the interests of the force and the workforce" after an investigation into her conduct whilst serving as Assistant Chief Constable at Greater Manchester Police was reported.

The force's roads policing unit and its helicopter, Sierra Yankee 99, have been a feature in three television series: Traffic Cops, Sky Cops and Police Interceptors. The helicopter unit was subsequently taken over by the National Police Air Service (NPAS), and closed down.

In May 2016, it was reported that two serving police officers, a pilot serving with the National Police Air Service and two retired police officers who crewed the South Yorkshire Police helicopter were to stand trial accused of misusing the camera on the SY Police helicopter to film people who were naked or having sex. Four of the men denied charges of misconduct in a public office and were due to stand trial at Sheffield Crown Court on 17 July 2017. A fifth man did not appear at the hearing.  All of the men apart from the 5th were found not guilty of any offence by a jury.  The 5th had previously admitted four charges of misconduct in a public office.

In January 2020, the Independent Office for Police Conduct found that South Yorkshire Police had taken insufficient action to protect from harm a child, who had been sexually abused and exploited by Asian men for several years from 2003 onwards.  An unnamed chief inspector had told the investigation that the force had been aware of similar abuse for 30 years but had ignored it for fear of increasing racial tensions.  In July 2020 the Independent Office of Police Conduct again considered the force's response in relation to the death of Amy-Leanne Stringfellow

Chief constables

Roll of honour
The Police Roll of Honour Trust and Police Memorial Trust list and commemorate all British police officers killed in the line of duty. Since its establishment in 1984, the Police Memorial Trust has erected 50 memorials nationally to some of those officers.

The list below shows sworn police officers who have died whilst on duty:

Police area
The police force covers an area of approximately 600 square miles (1,554 square kilometres) which is made up of the county's three boroughs (Barnsley, Doncaster and Rotherham) along with the City of Sheffield. The resident population is 1.2 million.

The force is divided into four basic command units (BCUs):

 

Force headquarters is at Carbrook House, in Tinsley, Sheffield, following a move from Snig Hill police station in early 2013. This move saw the senior command team and other services (such as firearms licensing) move into one location, funded by the sale of out-dated buildings, including West Bar police station, and the future sale of vacated properties.

Management
The chief constable since May 2021 is Lauren Poultney. 
She replaced Stephen Watson, who left South Yorkshire Police to take over as chief constable of Greater Manchester Police. 
Watson replaced Dawn Copley, the former deputy chief constable, who stood down a day after assuming the acting chief constable post due to 'her conduct at a previous force being investigated'. 
Copley assumed the post after David Crompton was suspended regarding comments made about the Hillsborough disaster.

Governance
South Yorkshire Police is governed by the South Yorkshire Police and Crime Commissioner. The election took place on 15 November 2012, the same day as 40 other elections for the respective police and crime commissioners (the Metropolitan Police and City of London Police having other elected officials acting as Commissioner). His deputy, Tracey Cheetham, was confirmed by the South Yorkshire Police and Crime Panel in January 2013. This is a salaried position, which is coming under scrutiny by local press.
The incumbent PCC is Alan Billings, a former Anglican priest and Deputy Leader of Sheffield City Council, who was elected at a by-election on 30 October 2014, to replace Shaun Wright, the incumbent who resigned in the wake of the Rotherham child sexual exploitation controversy. The police and crime commissioner and his deputy are overseen by the police and crime panel.

Before November 2012, police governance was undertaken by the South Yorkshire Police Authority, made up of elected councillors from the four metropolitan boroughs.

See also
List of law enforcement agencies in the United Kingdom, Crown Dependencies and British Overseas Territories
Law enforcement in the United Kingdom

References

External links

 South Yorkshire Police at HMICFRS
South Yorkshire Safer Neighbourhood Teams
Guardian article; links between Hillsborough and Orgreave

Local government in South Yorkshire
Police forces of England
1974 establishments in England
Organizations established in 1974
Crime in South Yorkshire